Francisco Wellington Barbosa de Lisboa (19 January 1995), simply known as Robinho, is a Brazilian professional footballer who plays as a winger for Confiança.

Club career

Brazil 
Robinho began his career with Itapipoca in 2014. During that season he appeared in 9 matches and scored 1 goal. This caught the attention of Série B team, Ceará, where he was transferred and finished out the 2014 season with 5 appearances for the team. In 2015, Robinho played in 17 matches in various competitions for the team, but was loaned to Confiança Esporte Clube and finished the season with 13 appearances and 2 goals. In 2016, he maid 5 appearances in Série B for Ceará, but again was loaned out. This time to Esporte Clube Novo Hamburgo where he made 13 appearances and scored 2 goals. In 2017, Robinho was loaned to Cuiabá Esporte Clube in Série C making 8 appearances. In 2018, Ceará was promoted to Série A, the first division of the Brazilian football league system, Robinho made 2 appearances for the team before being loaned to Santa Cruz in Série C.

In total, Robinho totaled 14 goals in 119 appearances in all competitions during his time in Brazil.

Columbus Crew 
Despite bouncing around the lower divisions in Brazil, Robinho impressed former Columbus Crew coach Gregg Berhalter who made the signing before he left the Crew for a reported $200,000 The move to Columbus became official on 18 January 2019. Despite depth at the wing positions for Columbus, Robinho managed to make 17 appearances during the first half of the season.

Orlando City 
On 11 July 2019, Robinho was traded to Orlando City for $50,000 in Targeted Allocation Money (TAM). He made his debut for the team on 18 July 2019, starting in a 1–1 draw away to Portland Timbers. After making a total of 12 appearances in two seasons, Robinho had his contract option declined as part of the club's end of season roster moves in December 2020.

On 1 February 2021, Robinho returned to Brazil to sign for newly-promoted Campeonato Brasileiro Série B side Confiança.

Career statistics

References

External links
 

1995 births
Living people
Association football midfielders
Brazilian footballers
Brazilian expatriate footballers
Columbus Crew players
Expatriate soccer players in the United States
Ceará Sporting Club players
Cuiabá Esporte Clube players
Santa Cruz Futebol Clube players
Major League Soccer players
Orlando City SC players
Sportspeople from Ceará